Filmistan is an Indian film studio based in Goregaon, Mumbai. Spread over five acres, near Patkar College on S.V. Road, the studio has seven shooting floors, and a temple and garden for outdoor locations. Patkar College's reputation has increased due to this studio. It previously operated as a film production company as well.

History 
Shashadhar Mukherjee, Rai Bahadur Chunilal (father of music director Madan Mohan), Ashok Kumar, and Gyan Mukherjee left Bombay Talkies (Film production company and studio 1934-1953) after the death of director Himanshu Rai and founded Filmistan Studios in 1943.

Nasir Hussain, who joined Filmistan in 1948 as a writer, was successful as a  screenwriter for films such as Anarkali, Munimji and Paying Guest. He started film direction with Tumsa Nahin Dekha and became a successful director. Filmistan produced a number of successful hit movies in the 1940s and 1950s, including hits such as Shaheed (1948), Shabnam (1949) and Sargam (1950) and successful films such as Anarkali (1953) and Nagin (1954). Other notable films were Jagriti (1954), which won the Filmfare Best Movie Award in 1956, and also Munimji (1955), Tumsa Nahin Dekha (1957) and Paying Guest (1957).

However, in 1958,  Mukherjee left Filmistan to established his own studio, Filmalaya, and continued to produce films, such as Love in Shimla (1960) and Ek Musafir Ek Hasina (1962).

Eventually, Tolaram Jalan bought the studio from Sashadhar Mukherjee and Ashok Kumar in the late 1950s.

In the following years, the studio wound down. Dooj Ka Chand made in 1964, and directed by Nitin Bose, was one of the last films to come out of Filmistan Studios. The premises continued to function as a studio, with recent films such as Ra.One (2011) and Bodyguard (2011), shot there. Yash Raj Films' television serial Khote Sikkey and dance reality show Jhalak Dikhhla Jaa are shot there.

In 2011, Jalan refuted media reports, which claimed that the studio was up for sale. The present studio manager of Filmistan studio is Jasraj Purohit. More recently, the song "Offo" from the film 2 States (2014), was partly filmed at Filmistan Studio.

Filmography

References

Bibliography

External links
 http://filmistanstudio.com/

Film studios in Mumbai
Mass media companies established in 1943
Defunct companies of India
Indian companies established in 1943
Filmfare Awards winners